Xylota mimica is a species of hoverfly in the family Syrphidae.

Distribution
Madagascar.

References

Eristalinae
Insects described in 1941
Taxa named by Frank Montgomery Hull
Diptera of Africa